Necrothalassia compsias is a moth of the family Scythrididae, and the only species in the genus Necrothalassia. It was described by Walsingham in 1907. It is found in Algeria, Morocco and the Palestinian territories.

The wingspan is 9–10 mm. The forewings are white, speckled and smeared with brownish grey, shading to greyish fuscous in an outwardly angulated transverse fascia before the middle, and in an irregularly scattered oblique band of spots beyond the middle, with a few scales of the same dark colour about the apex. The cilia are brownish grey, with some white scales overlapping their base. The hindwings are shining, iridescent rosy grey.

References

Scythrididae
Moths described in 1907